Döbeln is a former district in Saxony, Germany. It was bounded by (from the north and clockwise) the districts of Torgau-Oschatz, Riesa-Großenhain, Meißen, Mittweida and Muldentalkreis.

History 

The region was originally populated by Sorbic peoples. In the early Middle Ages, the Daleminzian people settled along this section of the Mulde River. They were driven away by Germans after the Battle of Jahna in 928.

The present borders of the district were established in 1952, when the government of East Germany formed the new districts. Döbeln was one of the few districts which had not been changed directly after the German reunification. In August 2008, as a part of the district reform in Saxony, the districts of Döbeln, Freiberg and Mittweida were merged into the new district Mittelsachsen.

Geography 

The district was located on the banks of the Freiberger Mulde in the triangle between the cities of Dresden, Leipzig and Chemnitz.

Coat of arms

Towns and municipalities

External links 
  (German)